On My Knees may refer to:

 "On My Knees" (The 411 song), 2004
 "On My Knees" (Charlie Rich song), 1978
 "On My Knees" (Jaci Velasquez song), 1997
 "On My Knees" (Rüfüs Du Sol song), 2021
 "On My Knees", a song by Middle Kids from their 2018 album Lost Friends

See also
 Knee (disambiguation)